Eleutherodactylus dennisi is a species of frog in the family Eleutherodactylidae.
It is endemic to Mexico.
Its natural habitats are subtropical or tropical moist lowland forests and caves.
It is threatened by habitat loss.

References

dennisi
Amphibians described in 1970
Taxonomy articles created by Polbot